Robert Crichton Wyllie (October 13, 1798 – October 19, 1865) was a Scottish physician and businessman. He served for twenty years as Minister of Foreign Affairs in the Kingdom of Hawaii.

Early life
Wyllie was born October 13, 1798, in an area called Hazelbank in Dunlop parish of East Ayrshire, Scotland. His father was Alexander Wyllie. His mother, Janet Crichton, traced her descent from James Crichton.
He attended the University of Glasgow, earning a medical diploma by the time he was 20.
He left as a ship surgeon, intending to practice in Russia. He got as far as Valparaíso in Chile in 1818, then set up in practice in nearby Coquimbo. After a few years he gave up medical practice and became a partner in a successful trading business. He took a small yacht, Daule, to Kolkata, India (then called Calcutta), from 1824 to 1826, stopping in the Hawaiian islands en route. His cousin William Edward Petty Hartnell had settled near Monterey, California since 1822, taking the name Don Guillermo and a Spanish wife.

Wyllie returned to England in 1830, and continued to grow his fortune in banking with a partner named Lyall. He joined the expensive Reform Club in London. In 1842 he left for Mexico to investigate some of his investments in a group called the Spanish American Bondholders. Mexico was in financial trouble from the Texas Revolution and had essentially mortgaged vast amounts of land.
His cousin Hartnell provided detailed reports encouraging British settlement of California. He was involved with Manuel Micheltorena, governor of Alta California, and Wyllie proposed a plan to buy land in Sacramento Valley and colonize California in 1843.

Writing about this episode, a historian says:...no drama in the Pacific was complete without the fastidious, meticulous and verbose Scots busybody, Dr. Robert Chrichton Wyllie.

He stayed with British Consul to Mexico (and fellow Scot) Alexander Forbes, hoping to get help from his investors for the California scheme. The investors, however, were willing to wait to get their money back. Irish priest Eugene McNamara led what would be the closest attempt to assert British influence in California. By the time McNamara acted, however, events such as the "Bear Flag Revolt" gave the United States effective control over California.

Hawaii
Wyllie ran into his friend William Miller while in Mazatlán. Miller, although born in England, served as a general in the Latin American wars of independence under Simón Bolívar. The two had met earlier in Valparaíso. Miller had just been appointed British Consul to the Kingdom of Hawaii and convinced Wyllie to come with him while he was waiting for a response from his investors.
They arrived in Honolulu in January 1844 aboard . Miller continued on his voyage to Tahiti, since he was assigned to oversee British relations to all Pacific Islands. Wyllie stayed in the Hawaiian islands for the rest of his life.

Politics and diplomacy
Wyllie first worked as acting British Consul until Miller returned March 15, 1845. During this time he compiled in-depth reports on the conditions in the islands.
He was then appointed by King Kamehameha III as Minister of Foreign Affairs, Secretary of War, and to the legislature in the House of Nobles on March 26, 1845.

He was seen as a counter to the American influence of Gerrit P. Judd, who had been a missionary doctor before becoming the first Treasurer, effectively the most powerful position in the country. Judd had also been acting as Minister of Foreign Affairs up to the appointment of Wyllie. Judd served about a year as Minister of Interior, and then was given the title Minister of Finance April 15, 1846.
One of his first assignments was to list the various complaints between the previous British Consul Richard Charlton and the American Commissioner George Brown. Brown had been fairly universally disliked, and was removed by request of the Hawaiian government.

In 1847 he started collecting documents to form the Archives of Hawaii.

Crises and treaties
On August 12, 1849, French admiral Louis Tromelin staged a French Invasion of Honolulu. Tromelin sacked the city before sailing off with the king's yacht and other plunder. Judd and two young princes were sent to Europe to negotiate treaties, stopping in the United States on the way. Judd advocated annexation by the United States to protect against further actions by British and French.
Wyllie was more in favor of a simple treaty of Reciprocity.
Former Hawaiian newspaper publisher James Jackson Jarves negotiated a treaty with John M. Clayton signed on December 20, 1849.

In the meanwhile, Judd had met Charles Eames, the new American Commissioner and negotiated his own treaty in October 1849. Eames had been appointed by President James Polk for this purpose, but got only as far as San Francisco when he got involved in the California Gold Rush.
Eames was quickly replaced with Luther Severance as U.S. Commissioner. By 1850 he had treaties signed by the United States, Britain, France, and Denmark.

Wyllie had suggested dismantling the old Honolulu Fort, since its outdated armaments had proven to be useless in preventing attacks anyway. In 1850 he proposed developing land around the Honolulu Harbor including the old fort land. Distractions would prevent this from happening for several years.

A shipload of former gold prospectors led by Samuel Brannan arrived in 1851. These came to be known as the "filibusters".
Brannan's men destroyed some mail on their ship, hoping to start a surprise rebellion, but Wyllie had already heard rumors and had them closely watched. After vacationing for the winter, they left without getting any popular support.

Mixing business

Wyllie built a house in Nuuanu Valley he called Rosebank. He entertained foreign visitors at the house, and the area today still has several consular buildings.
In March 1853 he bought a plantation on Hanalei Bay on the north shore of the island of Kauai. After an 1860 visit by Queen Emma of Hawaii and her son Prince Albert Kamehameha he named the plantation Princeville. He named another part of the plantation Emmaville, but that name never stuck.
Originally the land was planted with Coffee which was not suited to the wet lowlands. It was then planted with sugarcane.
He was a founding member of the Royal Hawaiian Agricultural Society in 1850, contributing many papers.

Another former Scottish physician, William Jardine (1784–1843) had become wealthy trading opium out of Hong Kong. Wyllie made Jardine's nephews consuls to make sure the lucrative China trade continued.
When his sugar production was limited by a labor shortage, he proposed importing workers from Asia for plantation workers.

Annexation delayed
Wyllie would outlast many of his rivals and colleagues.
Elisha Hunt Allen was American Consul 1850–1853.
David L. Gregg became the US commissioner 1853–1858.
A smallpox epidemic in 1853 forced Judd to resign from the cabinet September 5, 1853.
By the end of 1853, foreign residents were pressuring the king to sign a treaty of annexation with the United States to protect them from more rumored insurrections.
Kamehameha IV became king in January 1855, and kept Wyllie in the cabinet. The new king had seen American racism first-hand on his 1849 trip, so ended all negotiations for annexation. 
James W. Borden became the US commissioner in 1858, and Thomas J. Dryer in 1861.
Kamehameha V then came to power when Kamehameha IV died November 30, 1863, and also kept Wyllie in the cabinet.

A letter once appeared in the Ayr Advertiser confusing Wyllie with English physician Thomas Charles Byde Rooke, who was adoptive father of Kamehameha IV's wife Queen Emma. It was titled "The Ayrshire Queen" and called Emma Wyllie's daughter.

"Holy war"
Wyllie kept Hawaii officially neutral during the American Civil War,
but promoted continuing trade of sugar and other products to the expanding Californian market. Meanwhile, he quietly tried to lessen the influence of conservative American missionaries.

In 1859, Wyllie instructed the Hawaiian Consul in London, Manley Hopkins to send a priest from the Anglican church. He also contacted William Ingraham Kip of the American Episcopal Church in California who supported the idea, but the Civil War prevented any help from them. Thomas Nettleship Staley, an Englishman, was consecrated as Bishop and arrived October, 1862, to start the Church of Hawaii. This was a more liberal church with pomp and ceremony missing from the dour American sects. Wyllie would even have dancing at his social events (previously prohibited as sinful), and held the first "fancy dress ball", coming in Scottish Highland Dress. He even invited the Catholic Bishop who came in his full Pontifical vestments.

Wyllie encouraged Emma to write to Queen Victoria, and despite the contrast in their respective dominions, they became lifelong friends. They exchanged condolences when their sons and then husbands died. Victoria sent an elaborate silver cup and offered to be godmother (by proxy) of the young prince.

In 1862 Lady Jane Franklin was entertained by Wyllie at his estates. He proposed awarding out peerage titles, with Lady Franklin as one of the first to be awarded by giving her the title of Baroness. The democratically minded Americans would not allow it, but he did introduce court etiquette rules and official titles for the royalty. He insisted on formal European-style military uniforms for both royalty and cabinet officers, and favored decorative medals such as the Royal Order of Kamehameha I.

Legacy
Wyllie died on October 19, 1865. Charles de Varigny who was serving as Minister of Finance, was his successor as Foreign Minister. He was the third person buried in the Royal Mausoleum of Hawaii, which had just been completed.
His nephew Robert Crichton Cockrane was named his heir, and changed his last name to Wyllie. Robert found out that the new sugar factory built on his Princeville plantation was deep in debt, and committed suicide in 1866. It was then bought by Elisha Hunt Allen at auction for a fraction of what Wyllie had spent on it.
A tomb built in 1904 was named for him, and his remains were moved there, along with members of the family of Queen Emma.

Rosebank was bought at auction by Charles Judd, son of Gerrit. Walter M. Gibson wrote that the personal papers were thrown out of the house, but most have never been found. He then sold Rosebank to Frederick August Schaefer.
However, his meticulous records of public government business became the basis of the Hawaii State Archives.

Works

References

Further reading

External links

 
 
 

1798 births
1865 deaths
Burials at the Royal Mausoleum (Mauna ʻAla)
Hawaiian Kingdom politicians
Hawaiian Kingdom Foreign Ministers
Members of the Hawaiian Kingdom Privy Council
Members of the Hawaiian Kingdom House of Nobles
19th-century Scottish medical doctors
People from East Ayrshire
Alumni of the University of Glasgow
Ambassadors of the United Kingdom to Hawaii